Dan W. Harrington was a Democratic member of the Montana Senate, representing District 38 since 2000. He was President Pro Tempore. He was previously a member of the Montana House of Representatives from 1977 through 2001.

External links
Montana State Senate - Dan W. Harrington official government website
Project Vote Smart - Senator Dan Harrington (MT) profile
Follow the Money - Dan W Harrington
2006 2004
2000 Senate campaign contributions
1998 1996 1994 1992 1990 House campaign contributions

Democratic Party Montana state senators
Democratic Party members of the Montana House of Representatives
1938 births
Living people